The 2013 Seguros Bolívar Open Bucaramanga was a professional tennis tournament played on hard courts. It was the fifth edition of the tournament which was part of the 2013 ATP Challenger Tour. It took place in Bucaramanga, Colombia between 23 and 29 January 2013.

Singles main draw entrants

Seeds

 1 Rankings are as of January 14, 2013.

Other entrants
The following players received wildcards into the singles main draw:
  Santiago Giraldo
  Nicolás Massú
  Álvaro Ochoa
  Eduardo Struvay

The following players received entry from the qualifying draw:
  Roman Borvanov
  Marcel Felder
  Patricio Heras
  Franko Škugor

Doubles main draw entrants

Seeds

 1 Rankings are as of January 14, 2013.

Other entrants
The following pairs received wildcards into the doubles main draw:
  Sam Barnett /  Kevin Kim
  Nicolás Barrientos /  Eduardo Struvay
  Ricardo Hocevar /  Nicolás Massú

Champions

Singles

 Federico Delbonis def.  Wayne Odesnik, 7–6(7–4), 6–3

Doubles

 Marcelo Demoliner /  Franko Škugor def.  Sergio Galdós /  Marco Trungelliti, 7–6(10–8), 6–2

External links
Official Website

Seguros Bolivar Open Bucaramanga
Seguros Bolívar Open Bucaramanga
Seguros Bolivar Open Bucaramanga